The 2007 World Indoor Bowls Championships  was held at Potters Leisure Resort, Hopton on Sea, Great Yarmouth, England, from 08-28 January 2007. The event was sponsored by Potters Holidays.

Alex Marshall won the men's singles defeating Mervyn King in the final achieving a record fourth title. Marshall won the title despite carrying a back injury and being seeded only seventh.

Winners

Draws and results

Men's singles

Men's Pairs

Women's singles

Mixed Pairs

See also
 2007 in bowls

References

External links
Official website

2007 in bowls
World Indoor Bowls Championship